San Antonio was a 74-gun, two-decked, third-rate ship of the line built for the Spanish Navy and launched in Cartagena in 1785.  She was present under Captain Salvador Medina at the Battle of Cape St Vincent in 1797.  In August 1800 the San Antonio was at Ferrol during the Royal Navy's Ferrol Expedition failed attempt to take the town.

French service 

By the terms of the Third Treaty of San Ildefonso of October 1800, Spain agreed to supply France with "six ships of war in good condition built for seventy-four guns, armed and equipped and ready to receive French crews and supplies". The San Antonio was handed over in May 1801 to become the French ship Saint Antoine under Commodore Julien Le Ray, though some Spanish seamen remained aboard.  Taking part in the Second Battle of Algeciras during the night of 12–13 July 1801, she was pursued by HMS Superb, Captain Keats, the combined French and Spanish crew engaging the British vessel as it approached. At 23:50 on the 12th, Keats laid his ship close alongside the new French ship, beginning a close and heated action as the ships of the line exchanged broadsides with one another in pitch darkness and with an increasing wind. For thirty minutes the battle continued until, with the ships off Cape Spartel in North Africa, a wounded Le Ray decided that his ship was no longer able to contest the action and hailed Superb to announce that he had surrendered. The halyards that held up his pennant had however become tangled in the rigging, giving the appearance that the ship was still in French hands: this later led Saint Antoine to be attacked repeatedly by other British ships as they came up during the night.  Keats remained with his prize, awaiting the arrival of the rest of the squadron: Caesar, Venerable, Spencer and Thames arrived after midnight, all firing on Saint Antoine as they passed before continuing westwards in search of other enemy vessels.

British service 
Saint Antoine was commissioned by the Royal Navy in 1801 as the San Antonio and sailed under Captain Dundas to Portsmouth.  There she was laid up for repairs and eventually commissioned as a Prison ship in October 1807, and later as a powder magazine from May to September 1814.  She was sold in 1828.

References

Bibliography
 
 
 

1785 ships
Ships built in Spain
Ships of the line of the Spanish Navy
Ships of the line of the Royal Navy
Ships of the line of the French Navy
Captured ships